Emplocia is a genus of moths in the family Geometridae.

Species
Emplocia aurantiaria (Thierry-Mieg, 1895)
Emplocia bifenestrata Herrich-Schaffer, 1855
Emplocia erycinoides (Walker, 1854)
Emplocia fleximargo (Dognin, 1903)
Emplocia lassippa (Druce, 1890)
Emplocia pallor (Druce, 1893)
Emplocia tricolor Felder & Rogenhofer, 1875
Emplocia xanthion (Druce, 1907)

References

External links
Natural History Museum Lepidoptera genus database

Ennominae